Təzəkənd is a village in the municipality of Tıxlı in the Khizi Rayon of Azerbaijan.

References

Populated places in Khizi District